

Events

January events 
 January 28 – Pittsburgh & Lake Erie Railroad acquires a section of the McKeesport and Belle Vernon Railroad around Belle Vernon, Pennsylvania.

February events 
 February 22 – Cleveland, Cincinnati, Chicago & St Louis Railway (the "Big Four Railroad") gains control of the Peoria & Eastern Railway in southern Illinois.

March events 
 March – Émile Zola's psychological novel with a railway setting, La Bête Humaine, is published in book form.
 March 4 – The Forth Bridge across the Firth of Forth in Scotland is officially opened and its contractor, William Arrol, is knighted.

May events 
 May 9 – Boston & Maine Railroad ends its lease of the Eastern Railroad of Massachusetts by purchasing it.
 May 20 – Wutach Valley Railway opened to provide a strategic route inside Germany without crossing the Swiss border.

July events 
 July 23 – Narrow gauge Kennebec Central Railroad opens to Togus, Maine.

August events 
 August 18 – The Kansas City Suburban Belt Railroad, a predecessor of Kansas City Southern Railway, begins operations between Kansas City and Argentine.
 August 19 – Pennsylvania Railroad subsidiary Ohio Valley Railway reorganized as the Pittsburg, Ohio Valley and Cincinnati Railroad.
 August 19 – In Quincy, Massachusetts, a jack used to level rails was left on the tracks. A passenger train then collided with it causing a derailment. Twenty-four people were killed due to the impact of the collision and through scalding.

November events 

 November 4 – Official opening of the City & South London Railway, earliest constituent of the Northern line of the London Underground and the first real deep-level electrified "tube" railway in the world.
 November 9 – First section of metre gauge Chemin de fer du Vivarais in southern France opens, using Mallet locomotives.
 November 10 – Compagnie Internationale des Wagons-Lits begins to operate the Rome Express train from Calais Maritime station via Paris and the Fréjus Rail Tunnel.
 November 26 – The Mito Line in Japan operates its first freight trains.

Unknown date events
 First Class О 0-8-0 steam locomotive built for service in Russia. 9129 locomotives of this type will be built up to 1928, making it the country's most numerous.
 Klien-Lindner axle patented.
 Hugh J. Chisholm forms the Portland and Rumford Falls Railway to link Androscoggin River papermills to the Maine Central Railroad.
 Leland Stanford begins his term as Chairman of the Executive Committee for Southern Pacific.
 Charles Francis Adams, Jr. steps down from the presidency of the Union Pacific.

Births

August births 
 August 16 – CP Couch, president of Kansas City Southern Railway 1939–1941 (d. 1955).

Deaths

July deaths 
 July 15 – Silas Seymour, chief engineer and/or consulting engineer for several railroads in New York in the mid- to late 19th century (b. 1817).

September deaths 
 September 30 – Frederick Billings, president of Northern Pacific Railway 1879–1881 (b. 1823).

References

 Morris, J. C., compiler (December 31, 1902), Annual report of the Commissioner of Railroads and Telegraphs; Part II, History of the Railroads of Ohio. Retrieved August 16, 2005.